The 2001 Vuelta a Andalucía was the 47th edition of the Vuelta a Andalucía (Ruta del Sol) cycle race and was held on 18 February to 22 February 2001. The race started in Córdoba and finished in Granada. The race was won by Erik Dekker.

Teams
Seventeen teams of up to eight riders started the race:

 
 
 
 
 Mercury–Viatel
 
 
 
 
 
 
 Nürnberger

General classification

References

Vuelta a Andalucia
Vuelta a Andalucía by year
2001 in Spanish sport